Mice in the genus Dendromus are commonly referred to as African climbing mice or tree mice, although these terms are often used to describe all members of the subfamily Dendromurinae.  The genus is currently restricted to sub-Saharan Africa, but fossils classified in the genus have been found from Late Miocene deposits in Arabia and Europe.

Characteristics
Mice in the genus Dendromus are small (Head and body: 5–10 cm) with relatively long tails (6–13 cm).  This tail is semi-prehensile and provides an aid in climbing.  The dense fur is grey or brown and either one or two stripes are present on the back.  Unlike most other muroids, these mice have only three fingers on each hand.  They are also distinguished by their grooved incisors.

Natural history
Habitat varies widely.  Elevation ranges from sea-level to 4300 m.  Anecdotal evidence suggests they are arboreal, but data supporting this hypothesis are limited.  They do appear to be good climbers and the degree to which they spend time in trees seems to vary by species.

Species
Genus Dendromus - Climbing mice
Montane African climbing mouse, Dendromus insignis
Mount Kahuzi climbing mouse, Dendromus kahuziensis
Lachaise's climbing mouse, Dendromus lachaisei
Monard's African climbing mouse, Dendromus leucostomus
Lovat's climbing mouse, Dendromus lovati
Gray climbing mouse, Dendromus melanotis
Brants's climbing mouse, Dendromus mesomelas
Banana climbing mouse, Dendromus messorius
Chestnut climbing mouse, Dendromus mystacalis
Kivu climbing mouse, Dendromus nyasae (kivu)
Nyika climbing mouse, Dendromus nyikae
Cameroon climbing mouse, Dendromus oreas
Rupp's African climbing mouse, Dendromus ruppi
Vernay's climbing mouse, Dendromus vernayi

References
Denys, C. and V. Aniskine. 2012. On a new species of Dendromus (Rodentia, Nesomyidae) from Mount Nimba, Guinea. Mammalia, 76:295–308.
McKenna, Malcolm C., and Bell, Susan K. 1997. Classification of Mammals Above the Species Level. Columbia University Press, New York, 631 pp. 
Musser, G. G. and M. D. Carleton. 2005. Superfamily Muroidea. pp. 894–1531 in Mammal Species of the World a Taxonomic and Geographic Reference. D. E. Wilson and D. M. Reeder eds. Johns Hopkins University Press, Baltimore.
Nowak, Ronald M. 1999. Walker's Mammals of the World, 6th edition. Johns Hopkins University Press, 1936 pp. 

 
Taxa named by Andrew Smith (zoologist)
Rodent genera